Ice is a 2011 British drama directed by Nick Copus and based upon James Follett's novel with the same name. The drama has 2 episodes. Main roles are performed by Richard Roxburgh, Frances O'Connor and Claire Forlani.

Plot
By 2020, global warming has increased significantly. Southern Europe has turned into a desert since it stopped raining, and similar events now happen in Northern Europe. Only the United Kingdom and some parts in the United States are unaffected. Furthermore, a global energy crisis exists as fossil fuels are running out.  The last known reserves are under seabed under Greenland's glaciers.
An American energy company, Halo, has the only licence to drill in Greenland.

Professor Thom Archer works at "Polar Alliance", a government service, whose purpose is to find connections between industrial activities in the Arctic and the melting of its ice. Thom tries to convince the authorities to revoke the licence of Halo. According to Thom the glaciers are melting very fast, and if they disappear the sea water will rise 7 metres, the North Atlantic Current will halt, potentially causing a new ice age in the Northern Hemisphere. Halo admits there is indeed a heating in that area but also claims Thom has no evidence there is a direct connection between the heating and Halo's activities. Therefore the government extends the licence.

As Thom's wife and daughter travel to visit his father in the UK for his daughter's birthday, Thom's colleague Peterson finds evidence that Halo's drills are responsible for the melting of the glaciers. Thom travels to Greenland only to find out Peterson was killed, apparently by a polar bear, but later determined to be at Halo's hand.

Despite this, Thom finds Peterson's evidence, as a new drill by Halo opens a geothermic source in the seabed. This source melts down all the polar ice in only a few hours. Thom's prediction is now a fact: the northern hemisphere is rapidly covered by an enormous amount of snow and temperature decreases to -22° Fahrenheit.

At Thom's insistence, the British Government advises the population to evacuate to the south, and they dismantle the apparatus of government. Meanwhile, Thom flies to the UK with ex-Halo environmental advocate Sarah Fitch, to rescue his family in a post-apocalyptic London.

External links
 

Post-apocalyptic television series
2011 British television series debuts
2011 British television series endings